The 1984 Miami Hurricanes football team represented the University of Miami during the 1984 NCAA Division I-A football season. It was the Hurricanes' 59th season of football. The Hurricanes were led by first-year head coach Jimmy Johnson and played their home games at the Orange Bowl. They finished the season 8–5 overall. They were invited to the Fiesta Bowl where they lost to UCLA, 39–37.

Overview
The Hurricanes were the defending national champions from the 1983 college football season. Having defeated number one ranked Auburn, and then Florida, they rose to be ranked number one before their game at Michigan. They remained in the top ten after that loss. They lost again to Florida State. They beat a ranked Notre Dame team in South Bend to return to the top 10. The Hurricanes earned three more wins, but then suffered two of the most notable losses in college football history.

On November 10, 1984 at the Orange Bowl Stadium, the Maryland Terrapins defeated the Hurricanes with the largest (at that time) comeback in college football. Down 31–0 at halftime, Frank Reich, who had been injured, came off the bench and led the comeback. At the start of the third quarter, Reich led the Terrapins on multiple scoring drives.  Three touchdowns in the third quarter and a fourth at the start of the final quarter turned what was a blowout into a close game. Maryland completed a 42–9 second half, and won 42–40.

Two weeks later at the Orange Bowl stadium, the Hurricanes faced the Boston College Eagles in a nationally televised game that has become known as "Hail Flutie". It has been regarded by FOX Sports writer Kevin Hench as among the most memorable moments in sports. The game is most notable for a last-second Hail Mary pass from quarterback Doug Flutie to wide receiver Gerard Phelan to give Boston College the win.

Schedule

Roster

Other: LB #45 George Mira Jr. (FR)

Game summaries

Auburn

Bernie Kosar 21/38, 329 Yds, 2 TD
Alonzo Highsmith 21 Rush, 140 Yds
Eddie Brown 8, Rec 157 Yds

Florida

    
    
    
    
    
    
    
    
    
    
    

Bernie Kosar 25/33, 300 Yds
Willie Smith 11 Rec, 152 Yds

Michigan

Purdue

Florida State

Rice

Notre Dame

at Cincinnati

Pittsburgh

Louisville

Kosar 22/36, 330 Yds
Highsmith 18 Rush, 100 Yds
Smith 10 Rec, 124 Yds
Brown 5 Rec, 113 Yds

Maryland

Boston College

vs. UCLA (Fiesta Bowl)

References

Miami
Miami Hurricanes football seasons
Miami Hurricanes football